John Henry Harrison (also referred to as Harry Harrison and John Harris) was a 38-year-old African-American man who was lynched in Malvern, Hot Spring County, Arkansas, by masked men on February 2, 1922. According to the United States Senate Committee on the Judiciary it was the 10th of 61 lynchings in America and 1 of 5 lynchings in the State of Arkansas during 1922.

Background

According to the 1920 census John Harrison was thirty-eight years old, married, and worked as a laborer in a Malvern lumber mill. In 1917, when he registered for the military draft, he was living at 405 Vine Street in Malvern. In early 1922 he began to show troubling behavior including stalking and threatening women. One of these woman reported his actions to Hot Spring County, Arkansas Sheriff Donald F. Bray who arrested Harrison in February 1922.

Lynching

Word of his arrest and that he was harassing white women spread and a mob quickly gathered on the evening of February 2, 1922. Sheriff Bray, fearing a lynching, tried to spirit Harrison out of the town by road to Arkadelphia, Arkansas, but found all roads blocked. He then tried to smuggle him out by train hiding him under a seat in the segregated "colored" section of the train around 10:30 PM. Just before the train could leave, a group of around 20 men stopped the train and went from car to car searching for Harrison. He was discovered, dragged a short distance away, and shot at least seventeen times.

Aftermath

In 1923 John Henry Harrison's sister, Callie Henry, tried to sue Sheriff D. S. Bray, deputies W. T. Gamble and S. H. Leiper, and W. H. Cooper for his death while in their custody as well as alleged leaders of the mob, including Clarence Chamberlain, R. S. Hodges, Leonard Stanley, and Ray Galina, but the courts ruled against her the following year.

National memorial 

The National Memorial for Peace and Justice opened in Montgomery, Alabama, on April 26, 2018. Featured among other things is the Memorial Corridor which displays 805 hanging steel rectangles, each representing the counties in the United States where a documented lynching took place and, for each county, the names of those lynched. The memorial hopes that communities, like Hot Spring County, Arkansas where Mr. Norman was lynched, will take these slabs and install them in their own communities.

See also
Mr. Norman was an African-American man who was lynched in Texarkana, Miller County, Arkansas by masked men on February 11, 1922
John West was a 50-year-old African-American man who was lynched in Guernsey, Hempstead County, Arkansas by a group of men on the Hope-Texarkana train on July 28, 1922.
Gilbert Harris was lynched on August 1, 1922, in Hot Springs, Arkansas. A white mob some 500 strong broke into the jail seized Gilbert Harris after overpowering the police in the public square (actually a triangle shape in front of the Como hotel). Even though Harris had a history of break and enters he professed his innocence. 
Less Smith was lynched in Morrilton, Conway County, Arkansas on December 9, 1922. Deputy sheriff Granville Edward Farish was trying to collect a debt from Smith when a scuffle broke out. In the fight, Farish smashed a bottle over Smith's head whereupon Smith shot him in the stomach. Smith was arrested and a white mob soon gathered. When officials tried to move Smith to another jail he was seized, hanged from a tree and his body riddled with bullets. When the body was taken to the undertaker the mob burst in to view the body.

References 
Notes

Bibliography 
 
 

1922 riots
1922 in Arkansas
African-American history of Arkansas
Lynching deaths in Arkansas
February 1922 events
Protest-related deaths
Racially motivated violence against African Americans
Riots and civil disorder in Arkansas
White American riots in the United States
Malvern, Arkansas